Amica Mutual Insurance Company is a Rhode Island-based mutual insurance company that offers auto, home and life insurance.

Amica was founded as the Automobile Mutual Insurance Company of America by A.T. Vigneron in 1907 and originally offered auto, fire and theft insurance. Since then, Amica has expanded to offering auto, home and life insurance, as well as owning a number of subsidiary insurance companies. It is the oldest mutual insurer of automobiles in the United States.

History

Originally named the Automobile Mutual Insurance Company of America, Amica was founded in 1907 by A.T. Vigneron in Providence, Rhode Island. Amica was organized as a mutual insurance company, meaning that company was owned by policyholders rather than stockholders.

In 1941, Amica opened its first branch office in Boston, Massachusetts, and now has 44 locations nationwide. The company added homeowners’ insurance in 1956, and later added marine and umbrella insurance.

In 1994, Amica’s corporate office moved from Providence, Rhode Island, to a larger campus in nearby Lincoln.

In 2007, Amica celebrated its 100th year of business.

Subsidiaries
Amica Mutual Insurance Company
Amica Life Insurance Company
Amica Property and Casualty Insurance Company
Amica General Agency, LLC

References

External links
Amica website
Annual Report for 2015

Insurance companies of the United States
Mutual insurance companies
Companies based in Providence County, Rhode Island
Lincoln, Rhode Island
American companies established in 1907
Financial services companies established in 1907
Mutual insurance companies of the United States
1907 establishments in Rhode Island